Zigon is a town in Tharrawaddy District, Bago Region of Myanmar. It is the administrative seat of Zigon Township.

References 

Populated places in Tharrawaddy District